The 8th Cavalry Division was a cavalry formation of the Russian Imperial Army, part of the 8th Army Corps. It was headquartered at Kishinev by 1914.

History 
The division was formed on 27 July 1875 from the 2nd Brigade of the 4th Cavalry Division, reinforced by a Don Cossack Regiment.

Organization
The division included the following units in 1914:

1st Brigade (Tiraspol)
8th Astrakhan Dragoon Regiment (Tiraspol)
8th Voznesensk Uhlan Regiment (Beltsy)
2nd Brigade (Odessa)
8th Lubny Hussar Regiment (Kishinev)
8th Don Cossack Regiment (Odessa)
8th Horse Artillery Battalion (Kishinev)
15th Horse Artillery Battery (Kishinev)
1st Don Cossack Battery (Bendery)

Commanders
The following officers commanded the division:

1875–1885 Alexander Nikolaevich Manvelov
1899–1904: Vladimir Alexandrovich Bekman

Chiefs of Staff
1875–1880: Alexander Kaulbars
1889–1893: Andrey Selivanov

References

Cavalry divisions of the Russian Empire
Military units and formations established in 1875
Military units and formations disestablished in 1918